The Ekirakukai (lit. Old Friends Association) was a political party in Japan.

History
The party was established as the Dōshikai ("Fellow Thinkers Association") in December 1912 by a group of 11 independent National Diet members, most of whom had previously been members of Yūshinkai. In March 1913 it was renamed Ekirakukai, by which time it had grown in size to 29 Diet members. In December 1913 it merged with the Seiyū Club to form the Chūseikai.

References

Defunct political parties in Japan
Political parties established in 1912
1912 establishments in Japan
Political parties disestablished in 1913
1913 disestablishments in Japan